Isperih Municipality is a municipality (obshtina) in Razgrad Province, Northeastern Bulgaria, located in the Ludogorie geographical region part of the Danubian Plain. It is named after its administrative centre - the town of Isperih.

The area is best known with the 3rd century BC Thracian Tomb of Sveshtari near the village of the same name.

Settlements 

Isperih Municipality includes the following 24 places (towns are shown in bold):

Demography 
The following table shows the change of the population during the last four decades.

Religion 
According to the latest Bulgarian census of 2011, the religious composition, among those who answered the optional question on religious identification, was the following:

See also
Provinces of Bulgaria
Municipalities of Bulgaria
List of cities and towns in Bulgaria

References

External links
 Official website 

Municipalities in Razgrad Province